Platysporoides is a genus of fungi in the family Pleosporaceae.

Species 
Extant species:

 Platysporoides chartarum (Fuckel) Shoemaker & C.E.Babc.
 Platysporoides cookei (Wehm.) Shoemaker & C.E.Babc. 
 Platysporoides crandallii Shoemaker & C.E.Babc. 
 Platysporoides deflectens (P.Karst.) Shoemaker & C.E.Babc. 
 Platysporoides donacis (Berl.) Shoemaker & C.E.Babc. 
 Platysporoides multiseptata (E.Müll.) Shoemaker & C.E.Babc. 
 Platysporoides patriniae (Nann.) Shoemaker & C.E.Babc. 
 Platysporoides punctiformis (Niessl) Shoemaker & C.E.Babc. 
 Platysporoides tirolensis (Rehm ex O.E.Erikss.) Shoemaker & C.E.Babc. 
 Platysporoides togwotiensis (Wehm.) Shoemaker & C.E.Babc. 
 Platysporoides ulgaris (Wehm.) Shoemaker & C.E.Babc. 
 Platysporoides vulgaris (Wehm.) Shoemaker & C.E.Babc.

References

Pleosporaceae